Amalie Thomsen (born 12 September 1994) is a Danish canoeist. She competed in the K-2 500 m and K-4 500 m events at the 2016 Summer Olympics and finished 12th and 6th, respectively.

References

External links
 

1994 births
Living people
Danish female canoeists
Olympic canoeists of Denmark
Canoeists at the 2016 Summer Olympics
Sportspeople from Aalborg